Stride is a brand of sugar-free chewing gum created by Cadbury (owned by Mondelēz International), sold in packs of 14 pieces. It was introduced in May 2006.

Current flavors

There are 20 flavors in total.
 Always Mandarin
 Eternal Melon
 Forever Fruit 2.0
 Mintacular
 Nonstop Mint 2.0
 Shift Berry to Mint
 Shift Citrus to Minty
 Spark Kinetic Fruit
 Spark Kinetic Mint
 Spark Kinetic Berry
 Shaun white whitemint 
 Spearmint 2.0
 Sour Patch
 Sweet Berry 2.0
 Sweet Cinnamon 2.0
 Sweet Peppermint 2.0
 Tropical Trance
 Uber Bubble 2.0
 Whitemint
 Winterblue 2.0
 Fearless Fruit
 Stride IQ

Stride 2.0
A new line of Stride, named the “2.0” series, was released in February 2011.  This series was released to upgrade some of the original flavors.

Stride Shift
Shift is a flavor changing gum in two flavors (Berry to Mint and Citrus to Mint). Because of the two flavors, the packaging for each flavor has two main colors. For Berry to Mint, the package's colors are magenta and light blue; for Citrus to Mint, the colors that are on the package are orange and light green.  It is not sold in Canada.

Stride Spark
Spark is a variant that comes in three flavors, Kinetic Mint, Kinetic Berry and Kinetic Fruit. One piece contains 25% of the Recommended Daily Allowance of Vitamin B6 and Vitamin B12, according to the label.

Discontinued flavors
Due to the release of Stride 2.0, the original Stride ‘1.0’ flavors that were upgraded have ceased production.
They are as follows:
 Forever Fruit 1.0
 Nonstop Mint 1.0
 Spearmint 1.0
 Sweet Berry 1.0
 Sweet Cinnamon 1.0
 Sweet Peppermint 1.0
 Uber Bubble 1.0
 Winterblue 1.0
Mystery Flavor '1.0'

International 
Stride was available only in the United States until January 2008, when the Spearmint, Sweet Peppermint and Forever Fruit flavors were made available in Canada. Most flavors are now available in Canada.

In Europe, some Stride flavors are being sold under the Trident Senses brand, namely the Winterblue 2.0 (sold as Mint Breeze), the Forever Fruit 2.0 (sold as Tropical Mix) and the Sweet Peppermint 2.0 (sold as Rainforest Mint and recolored to green), as well as the Mega Mystery, sold as itself. The packaging is a little more elaborate than the traditional Stride box, with the exception of the Mega Mystery which remains the same.
Some other flavors have been released, but they do not relate to any Stride flavors apart from some Shift flavors.

Country
 USA
 Canada
 China

Design 
The Stride Mnemonic 'S' and package was created by a design and branding firm   All packages of Stride include the Stride Mnemonic ’S’ except for Mega Mystery, which replaces the ’S' with a question mark (‘?’) on the front of the packaging. In 2014, the S was redesigned and is only on Spearmint, Peppermint, Winterblue, Nonstop Mint, Stride Spark Kinectic Mint and Fruit, and Sour Patch. Sour Patch is sold in three flavors: Lime, Red Berry, and Orange.

Marketing 

Stride chewing gum was unveiled at the All Candy Expo in 2006, when, after three years of product development, Cadbury claimed that through the use of proprietary sweetener mannitol it had produced a gum with longer-lasting flavor. Cadbury marketed the gum as "The Ridiculously Long Lasting Gum". Following competitive campaigning, New York based advertisers JWT were selected to handle the $50 million launch advertising, creating a series of work-place related ads that proved popular with consumers, according to polls by USA Today. These ads include the CEO of Stride gum begging customers to buy more gum as was popular at first but lasted too long and nobody came back for more. (October 29, 2006)  In addition, Cadbury received an industry OMMA Award for online advertising creativity on September 25, 2007 for "Best Use of Gaming" in connection with its "The Ridiculously Long-Lasting Gaming Event", when on June 21, 2006.  Stride teamed with Xfire to host a live "shoutcast" national videogame all-star challenge. Stride chewing gum sponsored a worldwide trip by Matt Harding in order for him to produce a popular viral video on YouTube in 2006. Starting November 5, 2009, Cadbury in connection with Kongregate sponsored "The Longest Lasting Game" contest, challenging game developers to design a game based around endurance in one month.

The growing gum market for Stride and other Cadbury-Adams brand Trident in the United States contributed to unexpectedly strong sales for the company in 2007.

Stride was heavily product placed on the television series, Smallville, particularly during season 7 - episode 13, "Hero", which features Kryptonite - laced Stride bestowing Elastic Man powers on the character Pete Ross. The use of a decommissioned Stride factory for concerts is also central to that particular episode.

References 

Stride Shift Citrus + Mint
Myth Busted: Stride Gum wrappers should NOT be chewed

External links
Stride gum website

Chewing gum
Products introduced in 2006
Cadbury Adams brands
Mondelez International brands